Pomacea columbiensis is a species of freshwater snail in the family Ampullariidae. It is native to Colombia, found in the Magdalena and Cauca rivers, and Ecuador, in the Pastaza River.

References 

columbiensis
Freshwater snails
Taxa named by Rodolfo Amando Philippi
Gastropods described in 1851
Molluscs of South America
Invertebrates of Colombia
Invertebrates of Ecuador